Eupithecia perculsaria is a moth in the family Geometridae. It is found in Kenya and South Africa.

Subspecies
Eupithecia perculsaria perculsaria
Eupithecia perculsaria influa L. B. Prout, 1932

References

Moths described in 1904
perculsaria
Moths of Africa